Vignoli is an Italian surname. Notable people with the surname include:

Alicia Vignoli (1911–2005), Argentine film actress
Adriano Vignoli (1907–1996), Italian cyclist
Ana María Vignoli (born 1945), Uruguayan former minister of Social Development
Farpi Vignoli (1907–1997), Italian sculptor
Fernando Vignoli (1960–2016), Brazilian painter and sculptor
Roberto Vignoli (born 1958), Italian photographer
Sofía Álvarez Vignoli (1899-1986), Uruguayan jurist and briefly First Lady of Uruguay

Italian-language surnames